The Sun Odyssey 490 is a French sailboat that was designed by Philippe Briand, Jean-Marc Piaton and the Jeanneau Design Office as an offshore cruiser and first built in 2018.

Production
The design has been built by Jeanneau in France, since 2018 and remained in production in 2023.

Design
The Sun Odyssey 490 is a recreational keelboat, built predominantly of fiberglass, with wood trim. It has a fractional sloop rig, with a bowsprit, a deck-stepped mast, two sets of swept spreaders and aluminum spars with discontinuous 1X19 stainless steel wire rigging. The hull has a plumb stem, a reverse transom with a drop-down tailgate swimming platform, dual internally mounted spade-type rudders controlled by twin wheels and a fixed fin keel or optional shoal-draft keel. The fin keel model displaces  empty and carries  of cast iron ballast, while the shoal draft version displaces  empty and carries  of cast iron ballast.

The helm wheels are leather-covered stainless steel, with an option of composite wheels instead. A mast furling mainsail is an option.

A "Performance" version has a taller mast and 9% larger sail area.

The design has sleeping accommodation for four to eleven people, in two to six cabins for private or yacht charter use. The galley is located on the port side, amidships. The galley is "U"-shaped and is equipped with a three-burner stove, a refrigerator, freezer and a double sink. A navigation station is aft of the galley, on the starboard side. Two to four heads may be fitted, with two forward and two aft.

Operational history
The boat is supported by an active class club, the Jeanneau Owners Network.

In a 2018 review for boats.com, Zuzana Prochazka wrote, "standing aft at one of the twin wheels, you can walk all the way to the bow without stepping or climbing over anything, least of all, a cockpit coaming. You can then walk all the way aft down the other side and arrive at the other wheel, again, without obstacles. The deck slopes gently up and onto the main side deck. Drains by the pedestals are there to gather up any water spraying up  over the bow and rushing down that slope toward the driver (In particularly snotty conditions, you'll want to drive from the high side just in case that drain doesn't quite get it all)."

In a 2019 Yachting World review, Pip Hare wrote, "personally, I don't find the Sun Odyssey 490 a pretty boat – it is bullish and reminds me of a fist punching through waves – however beauty can be found in function as well as form. This design is about easy living and easy sailing, and it offers a lot for the price. It is a big boat and will deliver fast and fun sailing in the right conditions. It is user friendly, versatile and has a stylish interior that offers no compromise on comfort."

See also
List of sailing boat types

References

External links

Keelboats
Dinghies
2010s sailboat type designs
Sailing yachts
Sailboat type designs by Philippe Briand
Sailboat type designs by Jean-Marc Piaton
Sailboat type designs by Jeanneau Design Office
Sailboat types built by Jeanneau